Marcin Kuźba (born 15 April 1977) is a Polish footballer - striker most recently playing for Górnik Zabrze.  In his career, he has played for such clubs as Wisła Kraków, Auxerre, Saint-Étienne and Olympiacos.

In the years 1995–2003 he played six times for Poland national football team scoring two goals.  He has retired from his professional career after leaving Górnik Zabrze on a mutual agreement on 17 May 2007. In January 2009 in one of the interviews he mentioned the possibility of signing for a lower league team.

References

External links

Living people
1977 births
People from Tomaszów Mazowiecki
Polish footballers
Poland international footballers
Górnik Zabrze players
Wisła Kraków players
AJ Auxerre players
Olympiacos F.C. players
AS Saint-Étienne players
FC Lausanne-Sport players
Ligue 1 players
Swiss Super League players
Ekstraklasa players
Super League Greece players
Polish expatriate footballers
Expatriate footballers in France
Expatriate footballers in Switzerland
Expatriate footballers in Greece
Sportspeople from Łódź Voivodeship
Association football forwards